Paradigm Entertainment Inc. (previously part of Paradigm Simulation) was an American video game development company. Paradigm is perhaps best known for its vehicle simulation games. Founded as a 3D computer graphics company in 1990, Paradigm primarily worked on realistic flight simulation technology for major space and aviation clients. The company got its start in game development when it was contacted by Nintendo in 1994 to aid in the creation of one of the Nintendo 64's launch titles, Pilotwings 64. The game was a critical and commercial success for the developer, causing the simulation and entertainment divisions of Paradigm to separate and focus on their respective products. The newly independent Paradigm Entertainment continued to develop for Nintendo's 64-bit console. After a short partnership with Video System, Paradigm was acquired as a wholly owned subsidiary of Infogrames in 2000 and began developing games for sixth-generation video game consoles. Paradigm was sold to THQ in 2006 and was ultimately closed in 2008.

History
Paradigm Simulation was founded in 1990 as a company based in Addison, Texas. It initially focused on creating commercial products for graphics developers, including military training simulations for pilots and ship captains and a lengthy client list that included the United States Department of Defense, The Walt Disney Company, NASA, Lockheed Martin,  Boeing, and McDonnell Douglas. Paradigm acted as a proponent of 3D computer graphics and virtual reality in the mid-1990s with its applications including the IRIS GL-based VisionWorks and the Performer-based Vega, which were used on Silicon Graphics workstations. Project sales for the company were $7 million in 1995, up from $3.5 million in 1994. During that time, the company frequented the annual Consumer Electronics Show,  SIGGRAPH, and Electronic Entertainment Expo (E3) conferences with its 3D technological demonstrations.

Nintendo reportedly contacted Paradigm in 1994 after it co-developed a realistic flight simulator called "Hornet" with the entertainment company Magic Edge Inc. Through connections to Silicon Graphics, designers of the Nintendo 64, Paradigm worked for nine months starting that same year on a technology base for its own Nintendo 64 software. At E3 in May 1995, engineers from Paradigm aided Nintendo in polishing a demo of the Nintendo 64 shown for developers and distributors in a whisper suite. Paradigm partnered with Nintendo the following month to begin development on Pilotwings 64, one of the first games available for the new console worldwide. The game was a success for the company, accounting for half of its revenues by the beginning of 1997 and had sold over one million copies worldwide by February 1998. In May 1996, one month prior to the console's Japanese launch, Paradigm released a turnkey development bundle titled "Fusion 64".

In March 1997, the entertainment wing was spun off to concentrate solely on video game production. The simulation division completed a merger with Multigen Inc. in October 1998 and was acquired by Computer Associates International Inc. in 2000. Multigen-Paradigm is now part of Presagis. In the early years as an independent studio, Paradigm Entertainment had a short, three-game partnership with the Japanese publisher Video System. The partnership ended with a lawsuit by the Texas-based developer against Video System regarding the latter's supposed breach of contract in the development and publishing of the flight simulator Harrier 2001.

At the start of 1999, Paradigm announced another 3D rendering and development tool called "VisKit", which was intended for use in creating next-generation console games being ported to multiple systems. On June 29, 2000, Paradigm Entertainment was acquired by Infogrames Entertainment, SA for $19.5 million or up to 700,000 Infogrames shares. Paradigm began developing games for sixth-generation consoles (PlayStation 2, GameCube, Xbox, and Dreamcast) after its final Nintendo 64 release Duck Dodgers Starring Daffy Duck. Works released during this time include an enhanced remake of the classic arcade game Spy Hunter, motocross racing games, and games based on the Terminator and Mission: Impossible multimedia franchises.

Following the stock market downturn, and in the light of poor game sales, Atari began to divest of its internal development studios in an effort to financially restructure. In spite of not having produced a profitable game in over six years, and a steady exodus of talent, Paradigm was sold in May 2006 to THQ. Although Paradigm's release Stuntman: Ignition and THQ's Juiced 2: Hot Import Nights were the parent company's top sellers in their release quarter, THQ reported overall financial losses of $16.3 million during the first half of its 2007 fiscal year. "While we have shipped more than 1 million units worldwide on each of these titles, this is significantly below our internal forecast", stated THQ's CEO Brian Farrell. "In both cases we did not receive our required game play mechanic and overall product quality targets. Quality matters and we missed the mark." On November 3, 2008, the company officially ceased operations. Paradigm's general manager Dave Gatchel went on to serve the same position at THQ's studio in Montreal and is currently working at Ubisoft Montreal following the studio's acquisition by Ubisoft in 2013. The remaining staff relocated to other companies, such as Gearbox Software.

Game titles
1996: Pilotwings 64 (Nintendo 64)
1997: Aero Fighters Assault (Nintendo 64)
1998: F-1 World Grand Prix (Nintendo 64)
1999: Beetle Adventure Racing (Nintendo 64, released in Australia as HSV Adventure Racing)
1999: F-1 World Grand Prix II (Nintendo 64, Europe only)
2000: Duck Dodgers Starring Daffy Duck (Nintendo 64)
2000: Indy Racing 2000 (Nintendo 64)
2001: MX Rider (PlayStation 2)
2001: Spy Hunter (PlayStation 2)
2002: Big Air Freestyle (GameCube)
2002: The Terminator: Dawn of Fate (PlayStation 2 / Xbox)
2003: Mission: Impossible – Operation Surma (PlayStation 2 / Xbox / GameCube)
2004: Terminator 3: The Redemption (PlayStation 2 / Xbox / GameCube)
2006: Battlezone (PlayStation Portable)
2007: Stuntman: Ignition (Xbox 360 / PlayStation 3 / PlayStation 2)
Cancelled: Unannounced first-person shooter (Xbox 360 / PlayStation 3 / PC)
Cancelled: Magic Karts (PlayStation 2)
Cancelled: Asteroids 3D (Xbox)
Cancelled: Harrier 2001 (Nintendo 64)
Cancelled: Skies (Heat.net)
Cancelled: Pilotwings 64 sequel (Nintendo 64)
Cancelled: Beetle Adventure Racing II (Nintendo 64).

References

External links
Games Made in Texas (1980 - 2007)

THQ
Atari
Video game companies established in 1997
Video game companies disestablished in 2008
Defunct video game companies of the United States
Video game development companies
Defunct companies based in Texas